Green Signal is a 2014 Telugu-language film directed by Vijay Maddhala and produced by Rudrapati Ramana Rao. It was co produced by Maruthi. It features an ensemble cast of Revanth, Shilpi Sharma, Gopal Sai, Maanas, Ashutosh, Rakshita, Manali Rathod, Dimple Chopade in the lead roles. The film is a remake of Hindi film Pyaar Ka Punchnama. The film released on 30 May 2014 in theaters.

Cast
 Revanth as Naidu
 Manas as Sandeep Kumar (Sandy)
 Gopal Sai as Google
 Ashutosh as Prem
 Shilpi Sharma as Devika
 Anandhi as Jessie
 Manali Rathod as Sweety
 Dimple Chopade as Meera
 Chammak Chandra as Leena
 Raja Sreedhar as Mahesh
 Shravya
 Raja
 Kiran yadav
 lavanya yadav

Critical reception
The Times of India wrote, "It's almost as if the movie is just an excuse for the filmmaker to stitch together as many of pj's (Poor jokes) as possible. To call it a sleaze fest will be putting it kindly". 123telugu.com wrote, "Green Signal is one film which lacks in many departments. The premise chosen and subject had good scope for hilarious entertainment a comedy. But a weak narrative and mediocre direction kills this promising story". fullhyd.com wrote, "The film has some distasteful gay humour and some terrible sexist humour. The director fails to infuse the required energy into the proceedings, and the famous 3-minute monologue from Pyaar Ka Punchnama is recreated terribly...The Maruthi brand of movies immediately needs to be shown the red light". Indiaglitz.com wrote, "Unlike in a profound film, there is no much substance in this film...apart from some good dialogues here and there, the film is not worth it if you have watched the original". apherald.com wrote, "This could have perhaps been a good break-out film for Vijay Maddhala, only if he could have worked on some refreshing subject rather spoiling some well made Bollywood films. As it stands, Green Signal isn't one to rush to the cinema, but instead best enjoyed in parts on DVD or telecast".

Soundtrack

References

External links

2014 films
2010s Telugu-language films
Telugu remakes of Hindi films